Lee Ju-mi (born 24 April 1989) is a South Korean road and track cyclist. She won the silver medal in the time trial at the Asian Cycling Championships in 2016, 2017 and 2019, and won the gold medal in 2018.

Major results

Track

2011
 1st  Individual pursuit, Asian Track Championships
2014
 2nd  Team pursuit, Asian Games (with Lee Chaek-Yung, Lee Min-hye, Na A-reum, Son Hee-jung and Kim You-ri)
 2nd  Team pursuit, Asian Track Championships (with Lee Min-hye, Na A-reum and Kim You-ri)
2016
 1st Omnium, Yangyang International Track Competition
2017
 Asian Track Championships
1st  Individual pursuit
3rd  Team pursuit (with Kang Hyeong-Yeong, Kim You-ri and Son Eun-ju)
2018
 Asian Games
1st  Individual pursuit
1st  Team pursuit
 Asian Track Championships
1st  Individual pursuit
3rd  Team pursuit
2019
 Asian Track Championships (January)
1st  Individual pursuit
1st  Team pursuit
 Asian Track Championships (October)
1st  Individual pursuit
1st  Team pursuit
 3rd  Team pursuit, 2019–20 UCI Track Cycling World Cup, Hong Kong
2021
 2nd Team pursuit, National Track Championships
2022
 Asian Track Championships
1st  Individual pursuit
1st  Team pursuit

Road
Source: 

2015
 1st  Time trial, National Road Championships
2016
 National Road Championships
1st  Road race
1st  Time trial
 2nd  Time trial, Asian Road Championships
2017
 National Road Championships
1st  Time trial
3rd Road race
 2nd  Time trial, Asian Road Championships
2018
 1st  Time trial, Asian Road Championships
 National Road Championships
2nd Road race
2nd Time trial
 8th Road race, Asian Games
2019
 Asian Road Championships
1st  Team time trial
2nd  Time trial
9th Road race
 National Road Championships
1st  Road race
1st  Time trial
2020
 1st  Time trial, National Road Championships

References

External links

1989 births
Living people
South Korean track cyclists
South Korean female cyclists
Place of birth missing (living people)
Asian Games medalists in cycling
Cyclists at the 2010 Asian Games
Cyclists at the 2014 Asian Games
Cyclists at the 2018 Asian Games
Medalists at the 2014 Asian Games
Medalists at the 2018 Asian Games
Asian Games gold medalists for South Korea
Asian Games silver medalists for South Korea
20th-century South Korean women
21st-century South Korean women